The 2020–21 La Liga season, also known as La Liga Santander due to sponsorship reasons, was the 90th since its establishment. The season began on 12 September 2020 and concluded on 23 May 2021. The fixtures were announced on 31 August 2020.

Real Madrid were the defending champions, after winning a record 34th title in the previous season. Huesca, Cádiz and Elche joined as the promoted clubs from the 2019–20 Segunda División. They replaced Espanyol, Mallorca and Leganés, who were relegated to the 2020–21 Segunda División.

Exceptionally, this season the five substitutions were maintained in a maximum of three rounds per team, adopted in May 2020 due to the impact of the COVID-19 pandemic.

Atlético Madrid clinched their eleventh La Liga title on the final matchday of the season, after a 2–1 comeback win against Valladolid. It was their first title since 2013–14. Barcelona and Real Madrid were the only other teams to have won the title since Atlético Madrid last did so.

Teams

Promotion and relegation (pre-season)
A total of twenty teams contested the league, including seventeen sides from the 2019–20 season and three promoted from the 2019–20 Segunda División. This included the two top teams from the Segunda División, and the winners of the promotion play-offs.

Teams relegated to Segunda División

The first team to be relegated from La Liga were Espanyol, after a 0–1 loss to city rivals Barcelona on 8 July 2020, ending their 26-year stay in the top tier. The second team to be relegated were Mallorca, following a 1–2 home defeat against Granada on 16 July 2020, suffering an immediate return to the second division. The third and final team to be relegated were Leganés, after drawing 2–2 against Real Madrid on 19 July 2020 in their final game of the season. This ended Legas four-year stint in the first tier.

Teams promoted from Segunda División

On 12 July 2020, Cádiz became the first side to mathematically be promoted, assured of a return to the top flight after a fourteen-year absence following Oviedo's 4–2 win against Zaragoza. The second team to earn promotion were Huesca, following their 3–0 win against Numancia on 17 July 2020. This marked an immediate return to the first division after a season away. The final team to achieve promotion were Elche on 23 August 2020, following a 1–0 aggregate victory over Girona in the final of the promotion play-offs, sealing a return to La Liga after a five-year absence.

This was the first season since the 2018–19 season without any teams from the archipelagos of Spain (teams located on the Balearic Islands and Canary Islands) since Mallorca was relegated and Las Palmas failed to qualify for the promotion play-offs.

Stadiums and locations

Personnel and sponsorship

1. On the back of shirt.
2. On the sleeves.
3. On the shorts.

Managerial changes

 League table 

 Results 

Season statistics
Top goalscorers

Zamora Trophy
The Zamora Trophy was awarded by newspaper Marca to the goalkeeper with the lowest goals-to-games ratio. A goalkeeper had to have played at least 28 games of 60 or more minutes to be eligible for the trophy.

Hat-tricks

ScoringFirst goal of the season:  Yangel Herrera for Granada against Athletic Bilbao (12 September 2020)Last goal of the season:  Alejandro Gómez for Sevilla against Alavés (23 May 2021)

Discipline
Stats from:
Player
 Most yellow cards: 15  Stefan Savić (Atlético Madrid)
 Most red cards: 2  Pape Diop (Eibar)
  Djené (Getafe)
  Raúl García (Athletic Bilbao)
  Clément Lenglet (Barcelona)
  Aïssa Mandi (Real Betis)

Team
 Most yellow cards: 114 Getafe
 Most red cards: 8 Alavés
 Real Betis
 Fewest yellow cards: 57 Real Madrid
 Fewest red cards: 0'
 Atlético Madrid

Awards

Monthly

Annual

Number of teams by autonomous community

Notes and references

 
2020-21
Spain
1